Ekaterina Vasilyevna Zelyonaya; ( — 1 April 1991, Moscow), better known by her stage name Rina Zelyonaya, was a Soviet actress, singer and comedian. She was named People's Artist of the RSFSR in 1970.

Biography
Ekaterina Zelyonaya was born in Tashkent (modern-day Uzbekistan) into a Russian family of modest means, the third of four children. Her rare surname which translates from Russian as Green had been often taken for a pseudonym by people, just like her stage name Rina (short for Ekaterina). Her paternal grandfather Ivan Kuzmich Zelyoniy was a member of the Tashkent City Duma. According to the actress, her parents didn't fit each other at all.

Her mother Nadezhda Fyodorovna Zelyonaya was given away to marriage at the age 16. She was absolutely careless and couldn't plan family budget which led to grand scandals involving her husband – Vasily Ivanovich Zelyoniy, a low-ranking official, a stingy and generally unsympathetic man, as Rina described him. After he was transferred to Moscow, Rina entered a prestigious gymnasium for girls despite the lack of money.

During the October Revolution she entered the Moscow Theatre School where she studied for two years. Among her teachers were Maria Blumenthal-Tamarina, Illarion Pevtsov and Nikolai Radin. Hunger and the lack of job made her seek other options. By that time her father had been assigned with restoration of storage facilities in Odessa. Rina along with her mother and younger sister decided to join him and traveled to Odessa, but it turned out Vasily Zelyoniy had left the family for another woman.

Early popularity
Rina got sick with typhus along the way and as soon as she recovered, she joined the Odessa KROT theatre led by Viktor Tipot and Vera Inber, and that's where her career really started. After a while she returned to Moscow, performed in night cabarets with songs and musical numbers, and in 1924 became an actress of the Moscow Satire Theatre. From 1930 on she started performing with stand-up shows.

She became popular on account of her ability to imitate the speech of children. Although she appeared briefly in such well-known films as The Foundling (1939), for which she also co-wrote the script, Zelyonaya earned her living by touring the country and performing humorous skits from the life of children. She also provided the voice for cartoon characters and radio shows.

During the Great Patriotic War she visited the frontline and performed for soldiers, for which she was awarded the Order of the Red Star in 1944.

Later life
At an advanced age, she was cast in film roles of grannies, notably as Mrs. Hudson in the TV series The Adventures of Sherlock Holmes and Dr. Watson filmed by the Lenfilm movie studio between 1979 and 1986. She also published a book of memoirs Scattered Pages in 1981 which had been re-released several times since.

She died of cancer on 1 April, the same day she was supposed to receive the title People's Artist of the USSR. She was later buried in Vvedenskoye Cemetery near her husband – a famous Soviet architect Konstantin Topuridze (1905—1977), designer of The Stone Flower Fountain in Moscow with whom they had spent 40 years together.

Selected filmography
actress
 Road to Life (1931) as a girl from a gang Zhigan
 The Foundling (Подкидыш, 1939) as Arisha
 Tanya (Светлый путь, 1940) as secretary
 Encounter at the Elbe (Встреча на Эльбе, 1949) as female German with a bike
 Springtime (Весна, 1947) as film makeup artist
 The Girl Without an Address (Девушка без адреса, 1957) as Yelizaveta Timofeyevna
 A Groom from the Other World (Жених с того света, 1958) as Nina's mother
 Seven Nannies (Семь нянек, 1962) as woman in red
 Cain XVIII (Каин XVIII, 1963) as foreign governess
 A Tale of Lost Times (Сказка о потерянном времени, 1964) as old Nadia
 Operation Y and Shurik's Other Adventures (Операция "Ы“ и другие приключения Шурика, 1965) as a perturbed female passenger on bus №13
 Give me a complaints book (Дайте жалобную книгу, 1965) as elderly singer
 Three Fat Men (Три толстяка, 1966) as Ganimed
 The Twelve Chairs (12 стульев, 1971) as editor of "Bride and Groom"
 Chipollino (Чиполлино, 1972) as Countess Cherry
 The Adventures of Buratino (Приключения Буратино, 1975) as Tortila the Turtle
 About the Little Red Riding Hood (Про Красную Шапочку, 1977) as Grandma
 The Adventures of Sherlock Holmes and Dr. Watson (Приключения Шерлока Холмса и доктора Ватсона, 1979–1986) as Mrs. Hudson

voice
 The Key (Ключ, 1961) as fairy Giatsinta
 Who Said Meow? (Кто сказал мяу? 1962) as puppet
 A Little Frog Is looking for His Father (Лягушонок ищет папу? 1964) as little frog
 Vovka in a Far Away Kingdom (Вовка в Тридевятом царстве, 1965) as Vovka
 Most, Most, Most, Most (Самый, самый, самый, самый, 1966) as little Lion
 The Blue Bird (Синяя птица, 1970) as grandmother
 Losharik (Лошарик, 1971), as Losharik
 The Mystery of the Third Planet (Тайна третьей планеты, 1981) as Kolya's grandmother
 Alice in Wonderland (Алиса в Стране чудес, 1981) as Duchess

References

External links

 
Rina Zelyonaya biography at Russia-InfoCenter
Rina Zelyonaya at Animator.ru
Rina Zelyonaya in Krugosvet Encyclopedia 
Filmography 
Ekaterina Vasilyevna Zelyonaya

1901 births
1991 deaths
20th-century Russian actresses
20th-century Russian singers
Actresses from Moscow
People from Syr-Darya Oblast
People's Artists of the RSFSR
Russian film actresses
Russian stage actresses
Russian women comedians
Russian television actresses
Russian voice actresses
Soviet actresses
Soviet women singers
Soviet screenwriters
Soviet voice actresses
Women memoirists
20th-century Russian women singers
20th-century comedians
20th-century women writers
20th-century Russian screenwriters